Binu Pappu (born 13 December 1982), is an Indian actor and assistant director primarily working in the Malayalam movie industry. He is the son of legendary actor Kuthiravattam Pappu. He is mainly noted for his performances in the movies Helen, One, Operation Java and Bheemante Vazhi.

An experienced animator and entrepreneur, he ventured into acting with Saleem Baba's Gunda in 2014 and has worked with directors like Aashiq Abu, Mathukutty Xavier, Tharun Moorthy, Lal Jose, Johnpaul George, Rosshan Andrrews and Khalid Rahman. He has also worked as assistant director and chief associate director in nearly a dozen movies, including Mayaanadhi, Virus, and Halal Love Story. Before joining the movie industry, he worked as a 3D visualiser and creative supervisor for an architectural firm handling clients from across the world. 

Binu has also worked as a casting director for films like Guppy, Mayanadi, Virus, and Puzhu. A gearhead and an avid traveller, he is a member of KTM Jeepers, a Kerala-based organisation of off-roading enthusiasts. It holds events and camps to help charitable causes. Binu is inspired by the famous Walt Disney quote: "Animation can explain whatever the mind of man can conceive." He believes his background in animation has paved the way for his interest in cinema.

Early life and education 
Binu was born in Chennai to Padmini and actor Kuthiravattam Pappu. He moved to Calicut when he was around 4 years old and joined Presentation Higher Secondary School. He went on to study high school at Shri Gujarathi Vidyalaya Higher Secondary School. Binu showed an interest in drawing and painting since childhood and participated in school competitions.

After studying pre-degree at Malabar Christian College, he briefly pursued a BA in History at Zamorin's Guruvayurappan College. In 2004, Binu left for Bengaluru and joined BA Animation at Maya Academy of Advanced Cinematics on a scholarship. He also briefly worked at the institute’s Koramangala centre as a faculty member before starting his own company, BlueGrass Studios, in 2006. After leaving the company due to internal issues, he freelanced for some time, before joining Khan Global Engineering Consultants Private Limited in 2007 as a 3D visualiser.

Despite the global recession, Binu achieved steady growth at Khan Global. He particularly enjoyed creating 3D walk-through videos and other cutting-edge technology in architectural visualisation. He stayed with Khan Global for the next decade, serving as team leader, assistant manager, and executive director of Fluid CGI, a digital studio he co-founded in 2014.

Career

Actor 
Though his father was an actor, Binu never planned on entering the movie industry. His debut role was in 2014 in Gunda, directed by Salim Baba, where he was cast alongside Kalabhavan Mani and Tini Tom. It was his acquaintance with director Aashiq Abu that got Binu his more notable roles in Aashiq’s next two movies that year—Gangster and Rani Padmini. He did Puthan Panam in 2016 and Sakhavu in 2017 and Kala Viplavam Pranayam in 2018, a role that was critically acclaimed.

The year 2019 was pivotal in Binu’s acting career. He was appreciated for his powerful, albeit brief role in Lucifer. Then came Virus, Ambili, and Helen, all career hits. After a small role in Halal Love Story in 2020, in 2021 Binu acted in the crime thriller Operation Java, where he played Joy Pulimoottil. His role in Mammootty-strarrer One was also noted.

Assistant Director 
It was sometime in the year 2015 that Binu realised that his corporate career was clipping his artistic expression. He launched an animation company in Dubai around the time and was also acting in movies, shuttling between Kerala, Bengaluru, and Dubai. Simultaneously, he developed an interest in movie directing. While he was acting in Rani Padmini in 2015, Binu, who has travelled the northern states extensively, worked with the crew of the film closely, inspiring him to pursue that interest. In 2016, he joined Johnpaul George’s Tovino-strarrer Guppy as an assistant director. In 2018, he started working with Aashiq Abu on Mayaanadhi, and has been involved with it since the conception of the story.

He left his corporate job in 2018 to pursue films full-time. In 2019, Binu worked as an assistant director for Johnpaul George’s Ambili and Aashiq Abu’s Virus. He worked with Zakariya Mohammed for Halal Love Story in 2020 and Santhosh Viswanath for One in 2021.

Chief Associate Director 
Binu Pappu’s debut as Chief Associate Director was with Tharun Moorthy’s Saudi Vellakka. He was a chief associate in pre-production for Naaradan, Puzhu, and Thallumaala.

Filmography

As Actor 

All films are in Malayalam language unless otherwise noted.

Associate Director

References
https://timesofindia.indiatimes.com/entertainment/malayalam/movies/news/binu-pappu-pens-an-emotional-note-on-dad-kuthiravattam-pappus-22nd-death-anniversary/articleshow/89822196.cms - Binu Pappu pens an emotional note on dad Kuthiravattam Pappu’s 22nd death anniversary.

https://www.newindianexpress.com/entertainment/malayalam/2022/jul/26/sundari-gardens-set-to-premiere-on-sonyliv-2480566.html - Sundari Gardens set to premiere on SonyLIV.

https://www.thenewsminute.com/article/thallumala-review-kalyani-tovino-starrer-loud-cartoonish-and-fun-166781 - Thallumala review: This Kalyani-Tovino starrer is loud, cartoonish and fun.

https://economictimes.indiatimes.com/news/new-updates/actors-joju-george-and-binu-pappu-appear-before-rto-for-off-road-race/articleshow/91841334.cms - Actors Joju George and Binu Pappu appear before RTO for off-road race.

https://timesofindia.indiatimes.com/entertainment/malayalam/movies/news/binu-pappu-pens-a-romantic-note-for-his-wife-on-their-wedding-anniversary/articleshow/89456599.cms - Binu Pappu pens a romantic note for his wife on their wedding anniversary.

https://www.thehindu.com/entertainment/movies/actor-binu-pappu-on-his-cop-act-in-operation-java-and-his-journey/article34649304.ece - How ‘Operation Java’ helped Binu Pappu make his mark in Malayalam cinema.

https://www.doolnews.com/binu-pappu-shared-that-lukman-took-a-beating-from-him-in-thallumala-two-days-before-the-wedding-633.html - ലുക്മാന്റെ കല്യാണത്തിന് രണ്ട് ദിവസം മുമ്പാണ് എന്റെ കയ്യില്‍ നിന്നും അടി കൊണ്ടത്: ബിനു പപ്പു.

https://www.newindianexpress.com/entertainment/malayalam/2021/may/21/binu-pappu-starrer-kachi-released-on-neestream-2305264.html - Binu Pappu-starrer 'Kachi' released on Neestream.

https://www.mathrubhumi.com/special-pages/iffk-2022/podcast/interview-binu-pappu-iffk-2022-podcast-1.7372392 - സിദ്ധാര്‍ത്ഥ ശിവയുടെ രീതികള്‍ വ്യത്യസ്തം -ബിനു പപ്പു.

https://malayalam.news18.com/news/film/movies-binu-pappu-talks-about-his-new-role-in-the-movie-bheemante-vazhi-mm-481537.html - 'അഖിലേഷേട്ടനല്ലേ?' എന്ന് ഹിറ്റ് ചോദ്യവുമായെത്തിയ ജോയ് സാർ; ബിനു പപ്പു ഇനി 'ഭീമന്റെ വഴിയിലൂടെ.

https://www.manoramaonline.com/movies/interview/2021/12/09/interview-with-binu-pappu.html - അമ്മ പറഞ്ഞു,‘അച്ഛനെ എവിടെയൊക്കെയോ കാണാനുണ്ട്’: ബിനു പപ്പു അഭിമുഖം.

https://www.newindianexpress.com/entertainment/review/2021/dec/04/bheemante-vazhi-movie-review-lighthearted-drama-elevated-by-some-clever-moments-2391499.html - Bheemante Vazhi movie review: Lighthearted drama elevated by some clever moments.

https://www.manoramanews.com/news/spotlight/2021/12/13/actor-binu-pappu-special-interview.html - 'ജോലി ഉപേക്ഷിച്ചിറങ്ങി; എട്ടുവര്‍ഷം കഷ്ടപ്പെട്ടു; ഒടുവില്‍....

https://www.cinemaexpress.com/malayalam/news/2021/sep/14/tharun-moorthys-next-titled-saudi-vellakka-26641.html - Tharun Moorthy's next titled Saudi Vellakka.

https://www.deccanherald.com/entertainment/entertainment-news/operation-java-an-engaging-cybercrime-thriller-988278.html - Operation Java: An engaging cybercrime thriller.

Male actors in Malayalam cinema
Male actors from Kozhikode
Indian male film actors
Living people
1982 births
21st-century Indian male actors